The following radio stations broadcast on AM frequency 610 kHz: The Federal Communications Commission classifies 610 AM as a regional broadcast frequency.

In Argentina 
 LRK 201 in Añatuya, Santiago del Estero.

In Bolivia 
 CP 63 in La Paz

In Brazil 
 ZYH249 Maceió
 ZYH786 in Luziânia
 ZYI425 in Sinop, Mato Grosso
 ZYI544 in Redenção, Pará
 ZYI-678 in Souza (Sousa), Paraíba
 ZYI-899 in Teresina
 ZYK-532 in Mogi Mirim
 ZYK-577 in Catanduva
 ZYK-726 in Piraju
 ZYK-589 in Guaratinguetá
 ZYL-268 in Nova Lima and Belo Horizonte.

In Canada

In Chile 
 CD-061 in Base Teniente R. Marsh Martin / Base Presidente Eduardo Frei Montalva / Villa las Estrellas

In Colombia 
 HJKL in Bogotá
 HJD90 in Uribia

In Costa Rica 
 TIRPT in San José

In Cuba 
 CMGA in Trinidad
 CMJA in Mayarí Arriba

In the Dominican Republic 
 HIRJ in Santiago de los Caballeros

In Ecuador 
 HCMJ1 in Quito

In El Salvador 
 YSS in El Divisadero, Morazán

In Guatemala 
 TGGA in Senorial, Mixco

In Haiti 
 4VJS in Delmas, Ouest, Port-au-Prince

In Honduras 
 HRLP 4 in Santa Rosa de Copán
 HRLP in Tegucigalpa

In Paraguay 
 ZP 30 in Filadelfia

In Mexico 
 XEGS-AM in Guasave, Sinaloa
 XEUF-AM in Uruapan, Michoacán
 XEUM-AM in Valladolid, Yucatán

In Panama 
 HOHM in Panama City

In the United States

In Uruguay 
 CX4 in Montevideo

In Venezuela 
 YVSE in Barquisimeto

In Vietnam 
 VOH AM 610, Voice of Ho Chi Minh City

References

External links

 FCC list of radio stations on 610 kHz

Lists of radio stations by frequency